Piotr Gładki (8 February 1972 in Gdańsk – 27 May 2005 in Wyczechowo) was a long-distance runner from Poland, who won the 2000 edition of the Hamburg Marathon. He represented his native country at the 2000 Summer Olympics in Sydney, Australia, where he didn't finish in the men's marathon race. Gładki died in a car crash at age 33.

References

1972 births
2005 deaths
Polish male long-distance runners
Athletes (track and field) at the 2000 Summer Olympics
Olympic athletes of Poland
Road incident deaths in Poland
Sportspeople from Gdańsk
Lechia Gdańsk athletes